The Big Ten men's basketball tournament is held annually at the end of the men's college basketball regular season. The tournament has been played each year since 1998. The winner of the tournament is designated the Big Ten Tournament Champion, and receives the conference's automatic bid to the NCAA tournament. The Big Ten was one of the last NCAA Division I college basketball conferences to start a tournament. 

The finals of the tournament are typically held immediately before the field for the NCAA Tournament is announced, although in 2018 it was held the week before Selection Sunday.

On seven occasions, the champion of the tournament has gone on to reach the Final Four of the NCAA Tournament (Michigan State in 1999, 2000, and 2019, Illinois in 2005, Ohio State in 2007, Wisconsin in 2015, and Michigan in 2018). In 2000, champion Michigan State won the NCAA tournament. The No. 1 seed has won the tournament ten times, the most of any seed. The lowest seed to win the tournament was Michigan as a No. 8 seed in 2017. Three schools have won two consecutive championships: Michigan State (1999, 2000), Ohio State (2010, 2011), and Michigan (2017, 2018).

Host
The Big Ten Men's Basketball tournaments have been held at neutral sites every year. The first four tournaments were held at United Center in Chicago, Illinois. Beginning in 2002, the tournament alternated between United Center and Conseco Fieldhouse (later known as Bankers Life Fieldhouse, and now as Gainbridge Fieldhouse) in Indianapolis, Indiana. In 2008, the tournament began a five-year stay in Indianapolis.

On June 5, 2011, the Big Ten announced that the tournament would revert to alternating between Indianapolis and Chicago. The 2013 and 2015 tournaments were played at United Center in Chicago and the 2014 and 2016 tournaments were played at Bankers Life Fieldhouse in Indianapolis.

The 2017 tournament was held at Verizon Center in Washington, D.C. The 2018 tournament was held at Madison Square Garden in New York and held a week earlier than usual due to the Big East tournament, ending on March 4, 2018, one week before Selection Sunday. The 2019 through 2022 Tournaments returned to alternating between United Center in Chicago and Bankers Life Fieldhouse in Indianapolis. On February 9, 2021, it was announced that the 2021 edition of the tournament would be moved to Lucas Oil Stadium in Indianapolis due to health and safety protocols relating to the COVID-19 pandemic. The tournament will return to Chicago in 2023. On April 20, 2022, the Big Ten announced that Minneapolis will host the event in 2024 at the Target Center.

Vacated results
Due to various rulings against participating programs, some of the results of the Big Ten tournament have been vacated or voided. Here is a compiled list of sanctions imposed that have affected the results and records of the tournament since its inception. The information in this article does not include results of the teams in which records were vacated.
 Because of the Minnesota academic scandal, the NCAA has vacated the postseason tournament records for the Minnesota basketball team from the 1993–94 season through the 1998–99 season. Minnesota had a record of 2–1 in the 1998 tournament and went 0–1 in 1999.
 Because of the Ed Martin scandal, the NCAA vacated the records for the Michigan basketball team from the 1995–96 season through the 1998–99 season, including the 1998 and 1999 Big Ten tournaments. Michigan had won the Tournament championship in 1998 with a 3–0 record, and had a record of 1–1 in 1999.
 The NCAA has vacated most NCAA records for the Ohio State basketball team from the 1998–99 season through the 2001–02 season, including the 1999, 2001, and 2002 Big Ten tournaments.  Ohio State had a record of 1–1 in the 1999 Tournament, went 0–1 in 2001, and had won the championship in 2002.

Results by year

School records
Through 2023 tournament

Maryland, Nebraska, Northwestern, and Rutgers have yet to make an appearance in a Big Ten Men's Basketball Championship Game.

Performance by team
Through 2023 tournament

Key

*The 2020 tournament was canceled after the first round games due to the ongoing COVID-19 pandemic.

Records all-time by seed
through 2023 tournament

* Does not include vacated wins by Michigan (1998) and Ohio State (2002)

Records by coaches
through 2023 tournament 

Note: Current coaches at school in bold. Minimum of five wins.

Notes

Television coverage

See also

 Big Ten women's basketball tournament

References

 
Recurring sporting events established in 1998